Queen's Gate is a 1999 poetry collection by Danish poetess Pia Tafdrup. It won the Nordic Council's Literature Prize in 1999.

References

1999 poetry books
Danish poetry collections
Nordic Council's Literature Prize-winning works